Sturt, as a surname, may refer to:

 Charles Sturt (1795–1869), an English explorer of Australia
 Evelyn Sturt (1816–1885), English-born Superintendent of Police in Melbourne, elder brother of Charles Sturt
 Fred Sturt (born 1951), American National Football League player
 George Sturt (1863–1927), English writer on rural crafts and affairs who also wrote under the pseudonym George Bourne
 Henry Sturt (1795–1866), British landowner and politician
 Henry Sturt, 1st Baron Alington (1825–1904) 
 Humphrey Sturt (c. 1725–1786), British architect
 Humphrey Sturt, 2nd Baron Alington (1859–1919), son of the 1st Baron Alington
 John Sturt (1658–1730), English engraver
 Michael Sturt, (born 1941), English businessman and cricketer
 Montague Sturt, (1876–1961), English cricketer
 Napier Sturt, 3rd Baron Alington (1896–1940), son of the 2nd Baron Alington
 William Sturt (christened 1797, date of death unknown), English cricketer